Hrishyamukh is one of the 60 Legislative Assembly constituencies of Tripura state in India. It is in South Tripura district and a part of Tripura East Lok Sabha constituency.

Members of Legislative Assembly
 1972: Chandra Sekhar Dutta, Indian National Congress
 1977: Badal Chowdhury, Communist Party of India (Marxist)
 1983: Badal Chowdhury, Communist Party of India (Marxist)
 1988: Badal Chowdhury, Communist Party of India (Marxist)
 1993: Dilip Chowdhury, Indian National Congress
 1998: Badal Chowdhury, Communist Party of India (Marxist)
 2003: Badal Choudhury, Communist Party of India (Marxist)
 2008: Badal Choudhury, Communist Party of India (Marxist)
 2013: Badal Choudhury, Communist Party of India (Marxist)

Election results

2018

See also
List of constituencies of the Tripura Legislative Assembly
 South Tripura district
 Tripura West (Lok Sabha constituency)

References

South Tripura district
Assembly constituencies of Tripura